Rogers v. Wal-Mart Stores, Inc., 230 F.3d 868 (6th Cir. 2000), was a case decided by the 6th Circuit that held that remand to a state court cannot be achieved after removal to a federal court by lowering the damages sought to fall below the amount in controversy requirement.

Decision
The plaintiff sued Walmart in state court for a state law negligence action, seeking $950,000 in damages. Pursuant to 28 U.S.C. § 1441, the defendant removed to federal court on the basis of diversity jurisdiction.  The plaintiff reduced the damages sought to less than $75,000 and petitioned for remand to state court because the amount in controversy requirement was no longer met.  The 6th Circuit upheld a denial of the petition for remand, holding that the amount in controversy at the time of removal was what mattered.

References

External links

United States civil procedure case law
Diversity jurisdiction case law
2000 in United States case law
United States Court of Appeals for the Sixth Circuit cases
Walmart litigation